The men's 300 metres time trial event at the 2010 Asian Games was held in Guangzhou Velodrome, Guangzhou on 23 November.

Schedule
All times are China Standard Time (UTC+08:00)

Results

References

Roller Sports Results Book Page 3

External links
Results

Roller sports at the 2010 Asian Games